Wait Till Helen Comes is a 1986 novel by American author Mary Downing Hahn. It was first published on January 1, 1986, through HarperCollins and has since gone through several reprints. The book won a 1989 Young Reader's Choice Award and follows a young girl that must deal with supernatural events that surround her. The book deals with the subject of death and suicide, which has led some parents to request that the book be removed from school reading lists and school libraries.

Plot
Twelve-year-old Molly and her brother Michael resent their new seven-year-old stepsister Heather. Heather's mother died in a house fire when Heather was three, leaving her clingy and possessive of her father Dave and resentful and jealous of the attention he gives to his new wife Jean and her children. Heather constantly lies about Molly and Michael bullying her, causing Dave and Jean to mistrust them. The tension compounds when the family moves to a small town deep in the country where Molly and Michael will be unable to avoid Heather all summer. Superstitious Molly is also alarmed to learn that their new home is a converted church with an attached graveyard.

While exploring the graveyard, Heather discovers a tombstone hidden under a tree. The dates reveal the grave belongs to a seven-year-old child, but the stone bears only the initials H.E.H. Later Molly sees Heather wearing an antique silver locket with the same initials. Heather gloats that her new friend Helen Elizabeth Harper gave it to her.

The family returns from a trip to town to find all their personal possessions destroyed, except for items belonging to Heather and Dave. In secret Heather reveals to Molly that Helen destroyed their belongings and that Helen will do anything Heather asks. Molly follows Heather to the graveyard one night and finds her talking to a ghost child at the tombstone. The ghost disappears when she sees Molly, and Heather threatens revenge on Molly for driving off her friend.

Michael and Molly visit the town library and learn that Helen Elizabeth Harper was a real child who died one hundred years before. Her mother and stepfather died in a fire; Helen escaped the blaze only to panic and run into a nearby pond, where she drowned. Helen was buried under a temporary stone in anticipation of recovering the bodies of her parents, but they were never found, leaving Helen alone. Other children have drowned in the same pond over the years, and Molly begins to fear that Helen plans to lure Heather into the pond so that she will stay with Helen forever.

One evening while Molly babysits her siblings, Heather sneaks out. Fearing she has gone to the pond, Molly searches the woods behind the graveyard and eventually discovers the ruins of Harper House, where Helen is persuading Heather to join her in the pond. Molly leaps in to rescue her, but Helen vows to drown them both for Molly's interference. Molly tears the locket from Heather's neck and hurls it into the water. Helen releases them to pursue the locket, allowing Molly to drag Heather to shore. The girls take refuge in the ruins, but the floor collapses beneath them, plunging them into the cellar where they discover the lost skeletal remains of Helen's mother and stepfather.

A tearful Heather admits that she accidentally started the fire that killed her mother and now fears her father will stop loving her if he learns the truth. Helen likewise accidentally started the fire that killed her parents, making her the only person who understood Heather's guilt. Molly assures her that her father will always love her and that she, Michael, and Jean would also like to love Heather if only she would let them. As they talk, Helen appears in the cellar and begs her parents' bones to forgive her. Two more ghosts manifest and embrace Helen before the three spirits disappear. Seeing that Helen's parents forgave her, Heather feels hope that she, too, will be forgiven. Hours later, Dave, Jean, and Michael rescue them from the cellar. Heather confesses to her father about the fire, and he forgives her, understanding it was not her fault. With Heather's guilt now relieved, the family finally begins to bond.

At summer's end, the remains of Helen's parents are buried under a single stone angel with Helen, whose full name is now engraved upon their marker. While visiting their grave, Heather discovers the locket hanging from the angel's hand, along with a note from Helen asking Heather to remember her. Molly believes it is safe for Heather to keep the locket now that Helen is finally at peace.

Film adaptation

On 28 August 2014, actress Sophie Nélisse stated on her Twitter account that she will act in a film adaptation of the book as Molly. She also stated that her sister would act in the film as well. On 12 September 2014, Variety announced that financing and cast were in place and principal photography would commence on the production of a film adaptation of Wait Till Helen Comes. The work would be directed by Dominic James, and would star Maria Bello and the Nélisse sisters. Production was slated to begin later that same month. Principal photography began on 28 September 2014 in Winnipeg, Manitoba. Author Mary Downing Hahn appears in the film in a speaking role, mentioning to one of the producers that as a little girl she had always wanted to be an actress in movies. This is the first of her books to be adapted into a feature film. The movie was released in November 2016.

Reception
Kirkus Reviews praised the book but commented that it would be a more appealing read for "children comfortable with the genre" as the material in the book was "serious and chilling". Vice reviewed the book from an adult's perspective, stating that while the book's resolution would make sense to a younger reader, that they did not believe that the issues would not be easily solved by talking to the adults, as they believed that Heather's troubles did not solely stem from her keeping a secret.

Awards
Golden Sower Award (1995, won) 
Iowa Children's Choice Award
Maud Hart Lovelace Award
Rebecca Caudhill Young Readers' Book Award
Texas Bluebonnet Award
Pacific Northwest Young Reader's Choice Award
Young Hoosier Award
Virginia Readers' Choice Award
Volunteer State Book Award
Dorothy Canfield Fisher Award
Utah Children's Book Award

References

External links
 
 

1986 American novels
1986 children's books
American children's novels
Ghost novels
Clarion Books books